The 2015 FIBA Africa Basketball Club Championship (30th edition), was an international basketball tournament  held in Luanda, Angola from December 10 to 19, 2015. The tournament, organized by FIBA Africa and hosted by Clube Desportivo Primeiro de Agosto was contested by 11 clubs split into 2 groups of six and five, the top four of each group qualifying for the knock-out stage, quarter, semi-finals and final.
 
Petro Atlético de Luanda from Angola was the winner.

Draw

Squads

Preliminary round

Times given below are in UTC+1.

Group A

Group B

Knockout round
Championship bracket

5-8th bracket

9th place

Quarter finals

5th-8th place

7th place

5th place

Semifinals

Bronze-medal game

Gold-medal game

Final standings

Petro Atlético rosterDélcio Ucuahamba, Domingos Bonifácio, Gerson Gonçalves, Hermenegildo Mbunga, Jason Cain, Joaquim Pedro, Leonel Paulo, Manny Quezada, Paulo Santana, Pedro Bastos, Reggie Moore, Teotónio Dó, Coach: Lazare Andingono

Statistical Leaders

Individual Tournament Highs

Points

Rebounds

Assists

Steals

Blocks

Turnovers

2-point field goal percentage

3-point field goal percentage

Free throw percentage

Individual Game Highs

Team Tournament Highs

Points

Rebounds

Assists

Steals

Blocks

Turnovers

2-point field goal percentage

3-point field goal percentage

Free throw percentage

Team Game highs

All Tournament Team

See also 
 2015 AfroBasket

References

External links 
 
 

2015 FIBA Africa Basketball Club Championship
2015 FIBA Africa Basketball Club Championship
Africa Basketball Club Championship
International basketball competitions hosted by Angola
FIBA Africa Clubs Champions Cup